The Boeing Model 81 was an American training aircraft built by Boeing in 1928. The Model 81 was a development of the Model 64. It was powered by a newly developed engine, the 125 hp Fairchild-Caminez 4-cylinder radial engine. Operating at a much lower rpm than most engines (1000 rpm) it required the use of a large high-pitch propeller.

After initial flight tests with the Fairchild-Caminez, the prototype was refitted with a 145 hp Axelson engine, redesignated Model 81A and delivered to the Boeing School of Aeronautics. There, it was re-engined a number of times, first with a 115 hp Axelson engine, redesignated Model 81B. It then received a 165 hp Wright J-6-5, then a 100 hp Kinner K-5 and a redesigned vertical tail. Redesignated Model 81C, it would later be removed from training service, re-engined with an Axelson engine, and used as a classroom trainer.

On 21 June 1928, the second Model 81 built was delivered to the US Navy at Anacostia, Maryland for $8,300, and redesignated Boeing XN2B. Its trial with the Fairchild engine was unsatisfactory, and on 10 January 1929 it was refitted by Wright Aeronautical with a 160 hp Wright J-6-5 engine. Despite increased performance, it was not ordered into production.

Variants
81
Original Caminez-engined aircraft
81A
145 hp Axelson engine
81B
115 hp Axelson engine
81C
100 hp Kinner K-5, redesigned tail.
XN2B
US Navy designation.

Operators

Boeing School of Aeronautics

Specifications (XN2B)

References

Bowers, Peter M. Boeing aircraft since 1916. London: Putnam Aeronautical Books, 1989. 

Boeing Model 081
081
Single-engined tractor aircraft
Biplanes
Aircraft first flown in 1928